On November 6, 2012, the U.S. state of Oregon held statewide general elections for four statewide offices (secretary of state, attorney general, treasurer, and commissioner of labor), both houses of the Oregon Legislative Assembly, and several state ballot measures.

The primary elections were held on May 15, 2012. Both elections also included national races for President of the United States and five U.S. House Representatives. Numerous local jurisdictions — cities, counties, and regional government entities — held elections for various local offices and ballot measures on these days as well.

Federal

President of the United States

Democratic incumbent Barack Obama defeated his Republican opponent Mitt Romney in the national presidential election. In Oregon, the voters also chose Obama, giving him all of Oregon's 7 electoral votes.

United States House of Representatives

All five of Oregon's seats in the United States House of Representatives were up for re-election in 2012.  All five incumbents ran for and won re-election, including Democrat Suzanne Bonamici who won a special election in District 1 earlier in the year to replace Democrat David Wu.

Statewide

Attorney General
Incumbent Oregon Attorney General John Kroger, first elected in 2008, announced in October 2011 that he would not seek a second term, citing undisclosed medical issues. In April 2012, he announced would resign his office in June to become president of Reed College. On June 29, Democrat Ellen Rosenblum was sworn in as interim Attorney General. Rosenblum, a former judge on the Oregon Court of Appeals, also defeated former U.S. Attorney Dwight Holton in the Democratic primary and will compete for a full term in November against Republican attorney James Buchal, who had a successful write-in campaign in the Republican primary.

Democratic primary

Candidates
Dwight Holton, former interim U.S. Attorney for Oregon
Ellen Rosenblum, former Oregon Court of Appeals judge

Results

Republican primary

Candidates
No Republican filed to run in the primary, but a few weeks before the primary election, party officials sent postcards to Republicans urging them to write in Portland lawyer James Buchal. Buchal qualified for the general election with more than half the more than 25,000 write-in votes cast.

Results

General election

Candidates
 James Buchal (Republican), attorney
 Chris Henry (Progressive), truck driver
 James E. Leuenberger (Constitution, Libertarian), attorney
 Ellen Rosenblum (Democrat), interim Attorney General, former Oregon Court of Appeals judge

Polling

Results

Secretary of State
See Also: 2012 Oregon Secretary of State election

Incumbent Oregon Secretary of State Kate Brown, first elected in 2008, is seeking a second term. She defeated perennial candidate Paul Damian Wells in the Democratic primary and faces Republican orthopedic surgeon Knute Buehler in the general election. Buehler was unopposed in the Republican primary and also won the Independent Party nomination.

Democratic primary

Candidates
Kate Brown, incumbent
Paul Damian Wells, machinist

Results

Republican primary

Candidates
Knute Buehler, surgeon

Results

Independent Party of Oregon
Oregon allows candidates to be cross-nominated by up to three political parties. The Independent Party of Oregon holds a month-long online primary to select which candidate receives their nomination. The party chose candidates in a number of legislative and local races but only one statewide race, Secretary of State.

Candidates
Kate Brown, incumbent
Knute Buehler, surgeon

Results

General election

Candidates
Kate Brown (Democrat, Working Families), incumbent
 Knute Buehler (Republican, Independent), orthopedic surgeon
 Bruce Alexander Knight (Libertarian), store manager
 Robert Wolfe (Progressive), wine salesman
 Seth Woolley (Pacific Green), software engineer

Polling

Results

State Treasurer
Incumbent Oregon State Treasurer Ted Wheeler was appointed to the position in March 2010 following the death of Ben Westlund. Wheeler subsequently won a November 2010 special election to complete the remainder of Westlund's term. He is seeking re-election to a full term in 2012. Tom Cox, a management consultant who ran for Governor as the Libertarian nominee in 2002, won the Republican nomination as a write-in candidate.

Democratic primary

Candidates
Ted Wheeler, incumbent

Results

Republican primary

Candidates
No Republican filed to run in the primary, but a few weeks before the primary election, party officials sent postcards to Republicans urging them to write in Tom Cox, who won 5% of the vote as the Libertarian candidate for Governor in 2002. Cox won the majority of the more than 24,000 write-in votes to advance to the November general election.

Results

General election

Candidates
 Tom Cox (Republican), management consultant
 John F. Mahler (Libertarian), retired plant engineer
 Michael Paul Marsh (Constitution), retired landscaper, custodian, and paralegal
 Ted Wheeler (Democrat, Working Families), incumbent
 Cameron Whitten (Progressive), student

Polling

Results

Labor Commissioner
The Oregon Commissioner of Labor serves as the head of the state Bureau of Labor and Industries (BOLI), and is a nonpartisan position. Brad Avakian, a Democrat who has served as Commissioner since 2008, is running for re-election. Republican state Senator Bruce Starr is challenging Avakian.

General election

Candidates
 Brad Avakian, incumbent 
 Bruce Starr, state senator

Polling

Results

Legislative

The Democrats had a 16–14 majority  in the Oregon State Senate in the previous session. 16 of the 30 senate seats were up for election. In the Oregon House of Representatives, which was evenly split between Democrats and Republicans, all 60 seats were up for election. Democrats retained their 16–14 majority in the Senate, and took a 34–26 majority in the House.

Ballot measures
Nine measures appeared on the November ballot. Two were legislative referrals, four were initiated constitutional amendments, and three were initiated state statutes.

Measure 77

Referred by the legislature. Amends Constitution: Governor may declare "catastrophic disaster;" requires legislative session; authorizes suspending specified constitutional spending restrictions.

Measure 78

Referred by the legislature. Amends Constitution: Changes constitutional language describing governmental system of separation of powers; makes grammatical and spelling changes.

Measure 79

Initiated constitutional amendment. Amends Constitution: Prohibits real estate transfer taxes, fees, other assessments, except those operative on December 31, 2009.

Measure 80

Initiated statute. Allows personal marijuana, hemp cultivation/use without license; commission to regulate commercial marijuana cultivation/sale.

Measure 81

Initiated statute. Prohibits commercial non-tribal fishing with gillnets in Oregon "inland waters," allows use of seine nets.

Measure 82

Initiated constitutional amendment. Amends Constitution: authorizes establishment of privately owned casinos; mandates percentage of revenues payable to dedicated state fund.

Measure 83

Initiated statute. Authorizes privately owned Wood Village Casino at the closed Multnomah Greyhound Park; mandates percentage of revenues payable to dedicated state fund.

Measure 84

Initiated statute. Phases out existing inheritance taxes on large estates, and all taxes on intra-family property transfers.

Measure 85

Initiated constitutional amendment. Amends Constitution: allocates corporate income/excise tax "kicker" refund to additionally fund K–12 public education.

See also
 Elections in Oregon

References

External links
Elections Division at the Oregon Secretary of State
Oregon at Ballotpedia
Oregon judicial elections, 2012 at Judgepedia
Oregon 2012 campaign finance data from OpenSecrets
Oregon Congressional Races in 2012 campaign finance data from OpenSecrets
Outside spending at the Sunlight Foundation

 
Oregon
Oregon elections by year